University Hill may refer to the following communities:

University Hill, Syracuse a neighborhood in Syracuse, New York, in which Syracuse University, Upstate Medical University, and SUNY ESF are located
University Endowment Lands (also known as University Hill), a suburb west of the city of Vancouver
University Hill, Victoria, mixed-use estate in Bundoora, Victoria